WBOB (600 kHz) is a commercial AM radio station in Jacksonville, Florida.  The station airs a talk radio format and is owned by Chesapeake-Portsmouth Broadcasting Corporation.   Weekdays begin with a local news and information show, followed by mostly syndicated programming, including shows from Mark Levin, Mike Gallagher, Dennis Prager, Jay Sekulow and Red Eye Radio.  Most hours begin with Townhall News.  Some hours are paid brokered programming.  The station calls itself "Talkradio AM 600 & FM 101.1 WBOB".

By day, WBOB is powered at 50,000 watts, the maximum power permitted for commercial AM stations by the Federal Communications Commission (FCC).  But at night, to protect other stations on AM 600, it reduces power to 9,700 watts.  A directional antenna, located off Lenox Avenue in Jacksonville, is used at all times.  Listeners in Jacksonville and adjacent communities can also hear WBOB on FM translator station W266CX at 101.1 in Fruit Cove, Florida.

History

Early years
On December 9, 1933, the station signed on as WMBR, at 1270 kilocycles.  It was owned by the Florida Broadcasting Company and transmitted using 100 watts.  In the 1940s, WMBR moved first to 1400 kHz and transmitting with 250 watts, then move to 1460 kHz and increased its power to 5,000 watts.  WMBR was a CBS Radio Network affiliate, and carried its schedule of dramas, comedies, news, sports, soap operas, game shows and big band broadcasts during the Golden Age of Radio.

In 1948, it added an FM station, WMBR-FM (now WEJZ), and in 1949, it put a TV station on the air, WMBR-TV (now WJXT).  WMBR-TV was the first TV station in Jacksonville and carried programming from all the major networks initially.

Meanwhile, in 1942, another AM station went on the air in Jacksonville, WJDC at 1270 kHz.  It was owned by the Jacksonville Broadcasting Company and was powered at 5,000 watts. In a few years, it had moved to 600 kHz. It changed its call sign to WPDQ and was an ABC affiliate. Henderson Belk, a North Carolina businessman, purchased WPDQ in 1964 from Brush-Moore Newspapers.

Moving to AM 600
In the 1960s and early 1970s, WPDQ carried a Top 40 format, while WMBR stayed with its full service middle of the road (MOR) format. In 1975, after Belk sold the station to Robert Rounsaville of Atlanta, the two stations made a switch. WMBR took the better frequency at 600 kHz, describing its format as "Bright MOR Personality."  WPDQ moved higher up the dial to WMBR's old frequency, 1460 kHz, continuing its Top 40 format.

In 1977, AM 600 switched its call letters to WSNY, calling itself "Sunny 60," although the format remained the same. Then, in 1980, the call letters were changed to WAIV, and began simulcasting Top 40 programming from its FM sister station WAIV-FM, known as “The Big Wave.”

From Country to Talk
Pop Country became the new format in 1981 with a call letter change to WOKV, known as "OK 60 The Unrock." Music continued on WOKV through the 1980s, with various adjustments from pop country to adult contemporary to oldies. In 1986, the station was bought by EZ Communications.  AM 600 would then flip to a news/talk format, and was Jacksonville's original home of the syndicated Rush Limbaugh Show.

In 1994, Prism Radio Partners acquired the former WAPE, "The Big Ape." WAPE had Jacksonville's best AM signal, transmitting with 50,000 watts by day non-directional, and 10,000 watts at night with a directional signal. The WOKV callsign and news/talk programming was moved to 690 AM; the WPDQ callsign was again returned to AM 600, and flipped to an adult standards format.

Sports and Radio Disney
In 1996, WPDQ flipped to sports talk as "The Ball"; concurrent with the flip, WPDQ changed call letters to WBWL.

Cox Radio purchased the station in 1999, and in April 2002, WBWL was sold to The Walt Disney Company, and became Jacksonville's affiliate for Radio Disney on August 1 of that year.

WBOB Talk
Children's radio programming lasted until October 1, 2010, when Radio Disney sold WBWL to Chesapeake-Portsmouth Broadcasting Corporation. The call letters were changed to WBOB, and the format flipped to conservative talk, featuring Bill Bennett's Morning in America, Laura Ingraham and Glenn Beck, along with a variety of local news and talk programming.

As of the 2014 season, WBOB broadcasts games from the Jacksonville Sharks Arena Football League. Also in the mid-2010s, WBOB got a power boost, going from 5,000 watts day and night, to 50,000 watts in the daytime and 9,700 watts at night.

References

External links

FCC History Cards for WBOB

BOB
Radio stations established in 1933
1933 establishments in Florida
Former subsidiaries of The Walt Disney Company
News and talk radio stations in the United States